The Sijil Pelajaran Malaysia (SPM), or the Malaysian Certificate of Education, is a national examination taken by all fifth-form secondary school students in Malaysia. It is the equivalent of the General Certificate of Secondary Education (GCSE) of England, Wales and Northern Ireland, the Nationals 4/5 of Scotland, and the GCE Ordinary Level (O Level) of the Commonwealth of Nations. It is the leaving examination of the eleventh grade of schooling.

SPM is the penultimate examination sat by secondary school students before further studies in foundation, STPM, matriculation or diploma. The examination is set and examined by the Malaysian Examinations board (Lembaga Peperiksaan Malaysia). For those who attend international schools, the equivalent exam they sit for is the International General Certificate of Secondary Education exam. On the other hand, the Unified Examinations Certificate is equivalent to Advanced Level. All SPM examination papers are considered official secrets and are protected under the Official Secrets Act 1972 of Malaysia.

Starting from the year 2021, the Malaysian Ministry of Education introduced a new SPM format for the new KSSM syllabus, replacing the old SPM format for the old KBSM syllabus. Also for the English subject, the Common European Framework of Reference (CEFR) syllabus is implemented for the English Paper and the result statement will be handed out with the SPM Certificate.

History
The SPM provides the opportunity for Malaysians to continue their studies to pre-university level. Originally there is two version of SPM, one known as MCE (Malaysian Certificates of Education) taken by student studying in English school and SPM (Sijil Pelajaran Malaysia) taken by student studying in national school. Both examination was introduced in 1964. The difference between SPM and MCE are SPM was conducted using the national language (Bahasa Melayu) while MCE was conducted using English language. There is also the visual difference on how the certificate would look like. The MCE would use University of Cambridge Coat of Arm while SPM would use the Malaysian Government Coat of Arm at the top of the certificate. The MCE was discontinued in 1976 when the Ministry of Education took over the examination from UCLES and merged it with SPM. The predecessor of these exam were SPPTM (Sijil Pelajaran Persekutuan Tanah Melayu. Started in 1962) and FMC (Federation of Malaya Certificate. Started on 1957) before the formation of Federation of Malaysia.

Up to 1978, the examination was handled by UCLES, which still advises the Malaysian Examinations Syndicate on standards. The English paper is separately graded by the national examination board and UCLES, and both grades will be displayed on the statement slip. On the actual certificate, only the national examination board's grade is listed. The minimum requirements to obtain the certificate is to pass both Malay language and History.

Generally, the SPM is taken at the age of 17, though students who attended the pre-secondary transition class (commonly known as "remove class") would take it at the age of 18. Previously, students who successfully passed their Penilaian Tahap Satu (PTS) examination at Primary Three and chose to skip a year of primary school education would take their SPM a year earlier, at the age of 16. This was discontinued in 2000. Students who are home schooled generally take the SPM at the end of their secondary education as well.

Subjects

Compulsory subjects
Certain subjects are made compulsory for students. They are:

Elective subjects

Science and Mathematics

In 2003, the medium of instruction for the science and mathematics subjects was switched from Malay to English. Due to this transition, students taking science and mathematics subjects can choose to respond in the examinations in either English or Malay.

Languages and Literature

Economics & Business

Social Sciences & Religion

Arts and Health

Technical and Vocational

Old/Terminated subjects 
Due to the switch from KBSM syllabus to KSSM syllabus in 2017, some subjects have been terminated and switched to a fully new syllabus. The list does not include courses that have minor changes in name only.

Results
The evaluation scheme is fully exam-based. The examination for SPM usually takes place around November and lasts for more than 3 weeks. Papers are also scheduled in June for students who wish to resit for examinations they failed the previous year, but only for Bahasa Melayu, Sejarah and Mathematics.

When releasing the results, only the letter grades (and not the actual scores) are made known to the candidates. Candidates may request a remarking (regrading) if they suspect errors in the original marking. Although no list of rankings is released to the public, the names of the top ranked students in the country and in each state are released to the press. These students may achieve the level of temporary celebrities, and may even be approached by companies to advertise their products. Politicians usually visit some of these top ranked students a day before the official results to congratulate them. Because the SPM examination is the final nationally standardised examination taken by the majority of Malaysians, many scholarships are awarded based on SPM results.

Since 2010, however, the Ministry of Education has imposed a 10-subject limit on every candidate, while lowering the minimum number of subjects from 8 to 6. Students are allowed to take 2 additional subjects (comprising Arabic, Chinese, Tamil, Iban, Kadazandusun languages and Bible Knowledge) but they will not be taken into consideration for government scholarships.

Grade system
Candidates are assigned grades based on their scores in each subject. The exact grading scale used every year has never been made public.

Since 2009, grading system used has a range from A+ (the highest grade) to G (for "gagal" or fail; F is not used). The previous system assigned a grade point and a letter to each range, with 1A ("1" being the grade point and "A" the letter grade) as highest range and 9G the lowest. The Kepujian (Pass-With-Credit) grade are equivalent with UK GCSE Pass-With-Credit grade as stated on the back of the certificates.

The table below shows the comparison between previous grade system and the current one.

Sijil Pelajaran Malaysia Ulangan (SPMU)
SPMU was introduced for students who failed or got a low passing grade in certain core subject in SPM to retake it. SPMU is usually held on July in a normal circumstances; because of this, the exam is also known as SPM July Paper. Until July 2010 there was only one July Paper; Bahasa Melayu, as it was the first and the only compulsory subject to pass in SPM to be awarded with the SPM Certificate.

Bahasa Melayu (BM) was slowly dosed into the national school system beginning from 1960 but it was only made a compulsory subject in 1970 (i.e. to pass the Malaysia Certificate Education exam, a pass in BM is a must). Furthermore, a credit in BM is essential in order to secure a seat in sixth form. One of the many problems associated with this change is that many "good" students were unable to continue their post-secondary education because of their examination result in BM. In 1972, for instance, the BM failure rate was nearly 40%. To solve this problem, the July Paper was introduced so that students would be given a second chance to retake the paper.

As time passed, a lot of changes were made in education policy and from the higher education institution standpoint. In 2013, Sejarah (History) subject became the second compulsory subject to pass in SPM to be awarded with the SPM Certificate. Many universities also required students to achieve at least C in Mathematics or, in some colleges, to achieve at least Passing Grade. Because of this change and demand the Examination Syndicates announced that the Sejarah and Mathematics paper would have also been available to retake along with Bahasa Melayu paper in SPMU.

References

School qualifications
School examinations
Standardized tests
Education in Malaysia